Edward Benjamin Cottingham (June 27, 1928 – March 24, 2021) was an American politician in the state of South Carolina. He served in the South Carolina House of Representatives from 1955 to 1958 and 1967 to 1972, representing Marlboro County, South Carolina. He was a lawyer and judge and alumnus of the University of South Carolina.

References

1928 births
2021 deaths
People from Bennettsville, South Carolina
South Carolina state court judges
Members of the South Carolina House of Representatives
South Carolina lawyers
University of South Carolina alumni